Rachel Davis is a Canadian fiddler from Baddeck on Cape Breton Island, Nova Scotia, Canada.

Career
Davis has performed with musicians such as The Cottars, Buddy MacDonald, Carmel Mikol and Donnie Campbell. She has been showcased at the East Coast Music Awards and performs regularly at the Celtic Colours Festival. Davis has toured throughout Canada, the United States, Scotland, and Australia. Her eponymous debut CD was released in 2009, at the Celtic Colours Festival.  Davis is one of the members of the Celtic Music Group Còig.

Awards
2020 Canadian Folk Music Awards, Traditional Singer of the Year 
2010 Nominated for Canadian Folk Music Awards, Young Performer of the Year
 2009 Frank “Big Sampy” Sampson Award, sponsored by the Celtic Colours Festival Volunteer Drive'er Association, and Lakewind Sound Studios
2007 Tic Butler Memorial Award

References

Fiddler Records artists
Musicians from Nova Scotia
Cape Breton fiddlers
People from Baddeck, Nova Scotia
Living people
Year of birth missing (living people)
21st-century Canadian violinists and fiddlers
Canadian women violinists and fiddlers